Thrapston is a market town in North Northamptonshire, England. It was the headquarters of the former East Northamptonshire district, and at the time of the 2011 census, had a population of 6,239.

The town's name means 'Farmstead or town of a man named Thraepst'. Another source suggests the individual name is related with Old Germanic 'Trapsta', 'Trafstila' and 'thrafstjan' meaning 'to comfort:, henceforth 'farmstead or town of a man named Draefst or Draepst'.

Thrapston is situated close to the River Nene and is at the junction of the A14 and the A45. Until the 1960s, Thrapston had two railway stations. Thrapston (Midland) was on the Kettering to Cambridge route, and the former station and viaduct can be seen from the adjacent A14 road. Thrapston (Bridge Street) was on the former LNWR Northampton to Peterborough line.

A market charter was granted to the town in 1205, in exchange for two palfreys. This is celebrated every year with the town's Charter fair, when the high street is closed and the townspeople congregate in commemoration. A relative of George Washington, Sir John Washington, lived in Chancery Lane in the town, and his wife is buried in the Church of St James. Sir John was brother to George Washington's great-grandfather. Naturalist and writer Horace William Wheelwright practised as an attorney in Thrapston in the 1840s.

Thrapston had two schools, Thrapston Primary and King John Middle School, which together served children from Nursery to Year 8. However, in 2015, East Northamptonshire switched to a two-tier school system resulting in the middle schools closing. As King John School closed, Thrapston Primary School expanded into the King John building, in order to accommodate the year 5 and 6 children. Following this, children usually go to Prince William school in Oundle or another school in the area from year 7 onwards.

The town's football club, Thrapston Town, plays in the United Counties League.

The local authorities that cover different aspects of civic life in Thrapston are Thrapston Town Council, and North Northamptonshire Council.

Notable residents 
Henry de Thrapston (died c.1333),  English-born judge and Chancellor  of the  Exchequer  of  Ireland
John Hindhaugh, motorsport and media presenter

References

External links

 
Towns in Northamptonshire
Charter fairs
North Northamptonshire
Civil parishes in Northamptonshire